Fahad Al-Farhan may refer to:
 Fahad Al-Farhan (handballer) (born 1995), Saudi Arabian handballer
 Fahad Al-Farhan (judoka) (born 1955), Kuwaiti judoka